Antoine Sautier (died 1801) was a student gardener who was invited to join the Baudin scientific expedition (1800–1804) in the corvettes Géographe and Naturaliste to chart the coast of New Holland (Australia), make scientific observations and collect natural history specimens. This was the grandest such voyage of its kind in the early nineteenth century with a team of 22 savants (scientists, artists and engineers). He was a member of a team of 5 gardeners that served on this voyage, the others being Antoine Guichenot, François Cagnet, and Merlot all under the supervision of Head Gardener Anselme Riedlé.

Life
Little is known of his early life. He died and was buried at sea on 15 November 1801 on the leg of the voyage between Timor (visited from 21 August to 12 November 1801) and New Holland.

Collections
Collections were made in the Canary Islands;  Mauritius; Australia (Western Australia). His herbarium collections are held in herbaria in Paris, the British Museum and Kew (BM, G-DC, G-DEL, H, K, L, MO, NY, P, PC). A manuscript journal he maintained for the voyage is stored in the National Library of the Natural History Museum in Paris.

Honours
Commemorated in the genus Sautiera  Decne.

See also
 List of gardener-botanist explorers of the Enlightenment
 European and American voyages of scientific exploration

References

Bibliography

Further reading
 Chaudhri, M.N., Vegter, H.I. & de Bary, H.A., Index Herb. Coll. I-L: 434 (1972)
 Vegter, H.I., Index Herb. Coll. S: 828 (1986)

French gardeners
French horticulturists
Year of birth unknown
1801 deaths
Burials at sea
18th-century French botanists